The Reisseck Mountain Railway was a narrow gauge railway with a track gauge of 600 mm, that started at the top station of Schoberboden on the Reisseck Funicular Railway in Austria. It was closed in 2014.

History 
An industrial railway was required for the construction of the Reißeck-Kreuzeck Power Station. The line opened on 1 July 1953. Because, following the completion of the construction work, the line had to be kept going for maintenance reasons, it was decided to open the railway to tourists as well. The Reisseck Mountain Railway Company (Reißeck-Höhenbahngesellschaft mbH) was founded in 1969, although public services did not begin until 16 September 1965.

Route 
Together with the Reisseck Funicular the Reisseck Mountain Railway links Schoberboden with the Seenplateau ("Lake Plateau"). The line was 3,359 metres long, of which 2,130 metres ran through a tunnel. That meant the lines was the highest railway in Austria open to the public and one of the highest in Europe without a rack section. One train could carry 68 passengers.

Rolling stock 

Until 1983 self-built coaches with 36 seats were used for passenger services. They had a compartment at the end of the coach for the conductor. In 1983, two driving coaches were supplied by Knotz, each with a length of 10 metres and fitted for 14 seats and 20 standing places.

Branches 
Shortly before the terminus at the Seenplateau a 250-metre-long industrial, cable railway branched off. This was divided into two adhesion sections to the Hochalmsee and the Radlsee, most of which ran in a roughly 3-kilometre-long tunnel and was only authorised for goods transported for Verbund. These lines terminated at about 2,400 m.

Closure 
On 1 August 2014 heavy rain washed away parts of the trackbed of the mountain railway. On 9 August an emergency service was opened using a temporary halt.
On 7 September 2014 the operation of the railway, which was intended to be replaced by busses, was finally ended. The conversion of the tunnel into a road for the use of busses to the lakes required the dismantling of the trackage as well as the water pipe running through the tunnel to Reißeck I Power Station. Because this work could not initially be carried out due to delays in the construction of Reißeck II Power Station, tourist services ended for the foreseeable future at the Schoberboden.

Gallery

References

External links 

 Reisseck mountain lines
 Bilder der Reißeck-Höhenbahn im upper and lower sections
 The Reisseck Mountain Railway at DEEF, retrieved 16 August 2015

Railway lines in Austria
Reisseck Group